Gunna is a 2005 Kannada romance-action-drama film directed by Dwarki featuring Mayur Patel and Chaitra Hallikeri in the lead roles. The film features background score and soundtrack composed by Mahesh. The film released on 12 May 2005.

Cast
 Mayur Patel as Shambhu 
 Chaitra Hallikeri 
 Rangayana Raghu 
 Bhavya 
 Ramesh Bhat
 Sudeep  (Guest Appearance)

Soundtrack

References

External links
 

2005 romantic drama films
2005 films
2000s Kannada-language films
Indian romantic drama films